Three ships of the Royal Navy have borne the name HMS Lichfield, after the town of Lichfield in Staffordshire.

  was a 20-gun fireship, originally the Royalist ship Patrick. She was captured in 1658 by the Parliamentarians and renamed. She was renamed Happy Entrance in 1665. Her fate is unknown.
  was a 48-gun fourth rate launched in 1695, rebuilt in 1730 and broken up in 1744.
  was a 50-gun fourth rate launched in 1746 and wrecked on the north African coast in 1758.

There was also , a 36-gun fifth rate captured from the French in 1703 and sold in 1706.

References
 

Royal Navy ship names